The Appalachian State Mountaineers football team competes as part of the National Collegiate Athletic Association (NCAA) Division I Football Bowl Subdivision (FBS), representing Appalachian State University in the Eastern Division of the Sun Belt Conference. Since the establishment of the team in 1928 and their first FBS season in 2014, the program has competed in seven NCAA-sanctioned bowl games.

Bowl games

Notes

References

Appalachian State

Appalachian State Mountaineers bowl games